Events from the year 1990 in Canada.

Incumbents

and (senate 130)

Crown 
 Monarch – Elizabeth II

Federal government 
 Governor General – Jeanne Sauvé (until January 29) then Ray Hnatyshyn
 Prime Minister – Brian Mulroney
 Chief Justice – Brian Dickson (Manitoba) (until 30 June) then Antonio Lamer (Quebec) 
 Parliament – 34th senate (134)

Provincial governments

Lieutenant governors 
Lieutenant Governor of Alberta – Helen Hunley   
Lieutenant Governor of British Columbia – David Lam
Lieutenant Governor of Manitoba – George Johnson 
Lieutenant Governor of New Brunswick – Gilbert Finn 
Lieutenant Governor of Newfoundland – James McGrath 
Lieutenant Governor of Nova Scotia – Lloyd Crouse 
Lieutenant Governor of Ontario – Lincoln Alexander 
Lieutenant Governor of Prince Edward Island – Lloyd MacPhail (until August 16) then Marion Reid 
Lieutenant Governor of Quebec – Gilles Lamontagne (until August 9) then Martial Asselin 
Lieutenant Governor of Saskatchewan – Sylvia Fedoruk

Premiers 
Premier of Alberta – Don Getty  
Premier of British Columbia – Bill Vander Zalm 
Premier of Manitoba – Gary Filmon 
Premier of New Brunswick – Frank McKenna 
Premier of Newfoundland – Clyde Wells 
Premier of Nova Scotia – John Buchanan (until September 12) then Roger Bacon 
Premier of Ontario – David Peterson (until October 1) then Bob Rae 
Premier of Prince Edward Island – Joe Ghiz 
Premier of Quebec – Robert Bourassa 
Premier of Saskatchewan – Grant Devine

Territorial governments

Commissioners 
 Commissioner of Yukon –  John Kenneth McKinnon 
 Commissioner of Northwest Territories – Daniel L. Norris

Premiers 
Premier of the Northwest Territories – Dennis Patterson
Premier of Yukon – Tony Penikett

Events

January to June
January 15 – Massive cuts to Via Rail come into effect leading to the rerouting of The Canadian and many intercity trains.
January 24 – The Tories introduce legislation that would create the Goods and Services Tax (GST), a national sales tax.
January 24 – Jean Charest resigns from cabinet after he was found to have spoken with a judge.
January 29 – Ramon John Hnatyshyn replaces Jeanne Sauvé as governor general.
January 29 – A controversial resolution is passed by the city council of Sault Ste. Marie, Ontario, declaring the city "English-only".
February: The federal government announces that it will privatize Petro-Canada; the legislation to do so is introduced in October..
February 12 – A massive tire fire begins near Hagersville, Ontario.  It takes 17 days to put out.
March 9 – Newfoundland Premier Clyde Wells confirms he will rescind Newfoundland's approval of the Meech Lake Accord.
March 15 – The federal government decides that Sikhs may wear turbans while serving as Royal Canadian Mounted Police (RCMP) officers following the Baltej Singh Dhillon case.
March 22 – Canadian arms designer Gerald Bull is assassinated in Brussels.
May 12 – The Bloc Québécois Party is formed as several MPs led by Lucien Bouchard quit the Tories and Liberals.
 May 24 – The Edmonton Oilers win the 1990 Stanley Cup Finals.
 May 29 – Mikhail Gorbachev arrives in Ottawa for a 29-hour visit.
June 6 – Stanley Charles Waters is the first elected senator.
June 12 – Elijah Harper prevents Manitoba from accepting the Meech Lake Accord.
 June 17–30 – Nelson Mandela tours North America, visiting three Canadian and eight U.S. cities.
June 23 – Meech Lake Accord officially dead.
June 23 – Jean Chrétien elected leader of the Liberal Party of Canada at a leadership convention held in Calgary.

July to December
July 11 – The Oka crisis begins.
September 6 – Bob Rae's Ontario New Democratic Party wins a surprise majority in Ontario.
September 12 – Roger Bacon becomes premier of Nova Scotia, replacing John Buchanan.
September 26 – Oka crisis ends.
September 27 – Brian Mulroney temporarily increases the size of the Senate to ensure passage of the GST.
October 1 – Bob Rae becomes premier of Ontario, replacing David Peterson.
November 1 – Brian Mulroney launches the Citizen's Forum on Canada's Future to get Canadians' input on constitutional reform.
December 10 – Jean Chrétien is returned to the House of Commons after winning a by election for the New Brunswick riding of Beauséjour.
 December 13 – The Senate of Canada approves the GST..
December 17 – The GST becomes law.

Arts and literature
March 6 – The National Gallery of Canada acquires Barnett Newman's Voice of Fire for $1.8 million, causing a storm of controversy.

New works
Swann by Carol Shields published
The Evening News by Arthur Hailey
A Tenured Professor by John Kenneth Galbraith
TekWar by William Shatner
Magic Casement by Dave Duncan
Golden Fleece by Robert J. Sawyer
Medicine River by Thomas King
The Magic Machine: A Handbook of Computer Sorcery by Alexander Dewdney
Whylah Falls by George Elliott Clarke
The Wild Blue Yonder by Audrey Thomas
L'Oursiade by Antonine Maillet

Awards
See 1990 Governor General's Awards for a complete list of winners and finalists for those awards.
Books in Canada First Novel Award: Sandra Birdsell, The Missing Child
Geoffrey Bilson Award: Kit Pearson, The Sky Is Falling
Gerald Lampert Award: Steven Heighton, Stalin's Carnival
Marian Engel Award: Carol Shields
Pat Lowther Award: Patricia Young, The Mad and Beautiful Mothers
Stephen Leacock Award: W.O. Mitchell, According to Jake and the Kid
Trillium Book Award: Alice Munro, Friend of My Youth
Vicky Metcalf Award: Bernice Thurman Hunter

Music
RPM number-one hits of 1990
RPM number-one albums of 1990

Sport
May 13 – The Oshawa Generals win their fourth (and first since 1944) Memorial Cup by defeating the Kitchener Rangers 4 to 3 . The final game was played at Copps Coliseum in Hamilton, Ontario 
May 24 – The Edmonton Oilers win their fifth (and most recent) Stanley Cup by defeating the Boston Bruins 4 games to 1. Brandon, Manitoba's Bill Ranford is awarded the Conn Smythe Trophy
November 24 – The Saskatchewan Huskies win their first Vanier Cup by defeating the Saint Mary's Huskies 24 to 21 in the 26th Vanier Cup played at Skydome in Toronto
November 25 – The Winnipeg Blue Bombers win their tenth Grey Cup by defeating the Edmonton Eskimos 50 to 11 in the 78th Grey Cup   at BC Place Stadium in Vancouver. Scarborough, Toronto's Warren Hudson is awarded the game's Most Valuable Canadian

Date unknown
Doug Flutie returns to Canada to play with the BC Lions.

Births
January 18
Brett Lawrie, Canadian baseball player
Alex Pietrangelo, Canadian ice hockey player
January 24 – Mitchell Islam, ice dancer
January 29 – Danielle Parsons, curler
January 30 – Joe Colborne, ice hockey player
February 14 – Brett Dier, actor
February 23
 Kevin Connauton, ice hockey defenceman
 Marco Scandella, ice hockey defenceman
March 2 – Michael Hutchinson, ice hockey player
April 26 – Riley Voelkel, actress
May 13 – Jane Creba, murder victim (d. 2005)
June 3 – Jason Akeson, ice hockey player
June 4 – Jess Moskaluke, singer
June 5 – Junior Hoilett, footballer
June 7 – Michael Stone, ice hockey player
July 15 – Alexander Calvert, actor
August 7 – Jake Allen, hockey goaltender
September 7 – Megan McNeil, singer (d. 2011)
September 28 – Kirsten Prout, actress
October 23 – Dalmar Abuzeid, actor
November 9 – Chris Di Staulo, filmmaker
November 19 – Laura Walker, curler
December 10 – Reda Agourram, soccer player
December 11 – Michael Pillarella, actor, writer, film producer and spoken word artist
December 27 – Milos Raonic, tennis player
December 31 – Patrick Chan, figure skater

Deaths

January to June
January 7 – Bronko Nagurski, American football player (b. 1908)
March 16 – Dalton McGuinty Sr., politician and father of premier of Ontario Dalton McGuinty and the politician David McGuinty (b. 1926)
March 22 – Gerald Bull, engineer and artillery designer (b. 1928)
March 24 – Jim St. James, actor and HIV/AIDS activist
April 11 – Harold Ballard, owner of the Toronto Maple Leafs (b. 1903)

July to September
July 18
 Johnny Wayne, comedian and comedy writer (b. 1918)
 Gerry Boulet, Quebec rock singer (Offenbach) (b. 1946)
August 25 – Morley Callaghan, novelist, short story writer, playwright, and television and radio personality (b. 1903)
September 6 – Stan Roberts, politician (b. 1927)
September 11 – Lela Brooks, speed skater and world record holder (b. 1908)

October to December
October 22 – Carl Klinck, literary historian and academic (b. 1908)
October 30 – Craig Russell, female impersonator (b. 1948)
November 2 – Frederick Thomas Armstrong, politician (b. 1907)
November 9 – Hugh MacLennan, author and professor of English (b. 1907)
December 7 – Jean Paul Lemieux, painter (b. 1904)
December 24 – Tammy Homolka, murder victim (b. 1975)
December 31 – Robina Higgins, track and field athlete (b. 1915)

See also
 1990 in Canadian television
 List of Canadian films of 1990

References

 
Years of the 20th century in Canada
Canada
1990 in North America